Sibongileis a given name. Notable people with the name include:

Sibongile Besani, a South African politician
Sibongile Khumalo (b. 1957 – d. 2021) w, a South African singer
Sibongile Mchunu, a South African politician
Sibongile Mlambo, a Zimbabwean actress
Sibongile Ndashe, a South African lawyer and human rights activist.
Sibongile Judith Nkomo, a South African politician
Sibongile Novuka (b. 1998) is a South African rugby union
Sibongile Sambo (b. 1974),  a South African airline executive.

Bantu-language given